Tia is a Japanese female pop singer-songwriter from Saitama who is signed to Dive II Entertainment. Discovered and produced by Ryo of Supercell, Tia made her debut signed to Aniplex in 2012 with her single "Love Me Gimme". She moved to the record label Dive II Entertainment in 2014.

Career
While attending junior-high school, Tia streamed live videos of her singing on the Niconico video sharing website. Ryo of Supercell took an interest in Tia via these broadcasts and began collaborating with Tia in 2012 when she was in high school. Tia made her debut signed to Aniplex with her single  released on December 19, 2012; the song is used as the ending theme to the 2012 anime series Wooser's Hand-to-Mouth Life. She moved to the record label Dive II Entertainment in 2014 and released her second single  on March 12, 2014; the song is used as the ending theme to the 2014 anime series Noragami. Tia graduated high school in March 2014. Tia's third single "The Glory Days" was released on October 15, 2014; the song is used as the second ending theme to the 2014 anime series Captain Earth. Her fourth single  was released on November 25, 2015; the song is used as the ending theme to the 2015 anime series Noragami Aragoto. Tia's fifth single "Deal with the devil" was released on August 23, 2017; the song is used as the opening theme to the 2017 anime series Kakegurui.

Voice roles

Anime
2012
Wooser's Hand-to-Mouth Life (Yuu)

2014
Wooser's Hand-to-Mouth Life: Kakusei-hen (Yuu)

Discography

Singles

References

External links
 

Avex Group artists
Japanese women pop singers
Living people
Musicians from Saitama Prefecture
Year of birth missing (living people)